The Mighty Avengers is a comic book series that was published by Marvel Comics. Originally written by Brian Michael Bendis, also the writer of New Avengers, the title first featured an officially sanctioned Avengers team of registered superheroes, residing in New York City as part of the Fifty State Initiative, as opposed to the unlicensed team featured in The New Avengers. This first incarnation of the team is led by Iron Man and Ms. Marvel, with the second lineup featuring Hank Pym as the leader, and the third led by Luke Cage and Monica Rambeau.

Publication history
The team first appears in The Mighty Avengers #1 (May 2007), written by Brian Michael Bendis and pencilled and inked by Frank Cho. The roster, led by Ms. Marvel, also consisted of Ares, Black Widow, Iron Man, Sentry, Wasp and Wonder Man. In the wake of the superhero "Civil War", Iron Man recruits Ms. Marvel as leader of the revamped team. Together they select the first roster.

The Mighty Avengers was originally intended to run parallel with New Avengers, with characters and events crossing over and being viewed from both perspectives. However, artist Cho fell behind schedule, and left the book after six issues and an additional cover. Successor Mark Bagley drew the series from issues #7–11 (early March – late May 2008).

The series was canceled with The Mighty Avengers #36 (April 2010), at the conclusion of the Siege storyline.

The team was relaunched in September 2013 under the creative team of Al Ewing and Greg Land. The new team is more street-level, and is led by Luke Cage. The team contains new versions of Ronin, White Tiger and Power Man, plus Blue Marvel, the Superior Spider-Man, She-Hulk, Spectrum, and the Falcon. It ran for fourteen issues.

In November 2014 as part of the Marvel Now initiative, a third volume was launched called "Captain America and the Mighty Avengers". This volume was written by Al Ewing and illustrated by Luke Ross and Iban Coello. This volume was cancelled in June, 2015, after 9 issues.

Fictional team biography

Following the federally sanctioned creation of this iteration of the Avengers, Iron Man (Tony Stark) is discredited and publicly vilified after his inability to anticipate or prevent a secret infiltration and invasion of Earth by the shape-shifting alien Skrull race, and by the Skrull disabling of his StarkTech technology, which had a virtual monopoly on worldwide defense.

Following the Skrulls' eventual defeat and the subsequent dissolution of S.H.I.E.L.D., the officially sanctioned team of Avengers, now led by Norman Osborn under the H.A.M.M.E.R. banner, is spun off into the pages of Dark Avengers.

In response, Henry Pym, in his latest superhero persona as the new Wasp, leads an Avengers team outside the U.S. and H.A.M.M.E.R.'s jurisdiction. With the apparent help of the Scarlet Witch—actually, a disguised Loki, the Norse trickster god—he summons the Vision and Stature of the Young Avengers, U.S. Agent, Jocasta, Hercules, Amadeus Cho, and Iron Man.

Claiming to be the only authentic team of Avengers due to being the only team operating under that name to have a founding member on the roster, the team operates from an interdimensional headquarters. It is granted official recognition outside the U.S. by the international organization G.R.A.M.P.A., and combats supervillains and other entities including Chthon, and the Unspoken.

During the events of Infinity, a new team of Mighty Avengers are formed during Thanos' invasion of Earth. With the main Avengers branch off in space, the defense of New York falls to a group of former Avengers and the remnants of Luke Cage's recently disbanded Heroes for Hire squad. They are given the name "Mighty Avengers" after a Twitter hashtag used to describe the group.

During the Inhumanity storyline, Luke Cage keeps the Mighty Avengers together and made the remodeled Gem Theater as their base. The Mighty Avengers now have the purpose of helping those in need. During this time, the Spider Hero becomes the new Ronin.

During the "Last Days" part of the Secret Wars storyline, Steve Rogers tells the Mighty Avengers team that the world is ending and asks them to side with him or the Illuminati. Two weeks before the end of the world, the Mighty Avengers join Steve Rogers in a fight against the Illuminati. The Mighty Avengers help out in the incursion against Earth-1610.

Team Roster

Initiative Team (2007–2008)
The Mighty Avengers were founded by Ms. Marvel and Iron Man, as New York's team under the Fifty State Initiative.

International Team (2009–2010)
After the events of "Dark Reign", the Mighty Avengers were followed by a reorganized Initiative team published in Dark Avengers, and a new international team was featured in Mighty Avengers.

Infinity recruits (2013–2014)
During the Infinity storyline, a new team was assembled. "The Mighty Avengers" volunteer organization is based out of the old Gem Theatre in Times Square, offering their services as non-profit heroes for free or a charitable contribution.

Avengers NOW! (2014–2015)
The new team was relaunched under the title of Captain America and the Mighty Avengers as part of "Avengers NOW!"

Reception
The first issue of Mighty Avengers was the second highest selling comic for that month based on Diamond Publisher's indexes.

IGN reviewer Richard George said Brian Michael Bendis' writing for The Mighty Avengers #1 "manages to move through the roster selection, convey their basic information and personality, marshal them against a huge threat and leave us with a solid cliffhanger". George also praised Frank Cho's artwork, saying, "The artist not only delivers with some excellent action sequences, he does a great job with the increasingly standard widescreen format that many are adopting."

Circulation

Collected editions

In other media
The Mighty Avengers appear in Avengers Assemble. In the episode "Civil War, Part 2: The Mighty Avengers", Truman Marsh assembles Ant-Man, Black Panther, Captain Marvel, Ms. Marvel, the Red Hulk, Songbird and the Vision to become the eponymous Mighty Avengers after the original Avengers disassociate themselves from the Inhuman Registration Act. The Mighty Avengers are dispatched to a HYDRA facility to stop Baron Strucker from stealing Marsh's exo-suit, only to encounter the original Avengers and get into an altercation, during which Hawkeye convinces Songbird to defect to the original Avengers before they are arrested. In "Civil War, Part 3: The Drums of War", the Mighty Avengers join forces with the original Avengers upon learning Marsh plans to pit Inhumans and humans against each other and confront Marsh together before discovering he is actually Ultron. In "Civil War, Part 4: Avengers Revolution", the two Avengers groups fight Ultron's forces while working to free Inhumans from the android's mind-control.

References

External links
 Mighty Avengers (Initiative version) at Marvel Wiki
 Mighty Avengers (Luke Cage's version) at Marvel Wiki

Comics by Brian Michael Bendis
Comics set in New York City